Empompo "Deyesse" Loway, was a soukous recording artist, composer and saxophonist, in the Democratic Republic of the Congo (DRC). He was a member of the soukous band TPOK Jazz, led by Franco Luambo, which dominated the Congolese music scene from the 1950s through the 1980s.

Career
He helped Congolese singer M'Pongo Love early in her career by arranging her music and recruiting a wealthy patron to fund her work. He split up with M'Pongo in the mid-1980 and focused on developing another young Congolese singer, Vonga Ndayimba, known professionally as Vonga Aye and a backing band for her known as Elo Music. Early in 1981 he recorded a number of songs in Benin with guitarist Dr Nico Kasanda. When Nico left Tabu Ley's Orchestre Afrisa International in the middle of 1981, Empompo asked Nico to collaborate on some of his projects. Empompo together with Vonga Aye, Nico and 3 other musicians from Elo Music spent a month in Paris recording at the end of 1981. According to Empompo, they recorded enough material for six albums, but only two were released, both under Vonga Aye's name.

In 1983, in Kinshasa, Empompo and his friend from TPOK Jazz, Sam Mangwana, together with singer Ndombe Opertun, who had recently left TPOK Jazz, formed the band Tiers Monde Coopération. The band was reformed a few years later as Tiers Monde Révolution.

He died on 21 January 1990. Ken Braun, head of Sterns Music's in the U.S., described Empompo Loway together with Modero Mekanisi as "the best Congolese saxophonists of the [20th] century".

See also
 Franco Luambo
 Sam Mangwana
 Josky Kiambukuta
 Simaro Lutumba
 Ndombe Opetum
 Youlou Mabiala
 Mose Fan Fan
 Wuta Mayi
 TPOK Jazz
 List of African musicians

Notes

References

External links
 Overview of Composition of TPOK Jazz

1990 deaths
Democratic Republic of the Congo musicians
Year of birth missing
TPOK Jazz members